The Royal Victoria Patriotic Building is a large Victorian building in a  Gothic Revival style combining Scottish Baronial and French Châteauesque. It is located off Trinity Road in Wandsworth, London. It was built in 1859 as the Royal Victoria Patriotic School, by popular subscription as an asylum for girls orphaned during the Crimean War. It is a Grade II* Listed Building designed by the architect Major Rohde Hawkins.

Architecture

Exterior
The building's architect was Major Rohde Hawkins (1821–84). It is made of yellow brick with York stone dressings. It consists of three storeys arranged around two courtyards separated by a central main hall. There is an additional single-storey court on the east side. The roof is steeply pitched with slate. The metal-framed windows are mullioned and transomed. The style is a combination of Scottish baronial, Jacobean and French Châteauesque architecture. There are five major towers (three at the front) with pyramidal roofs, and many smaller corner turrets (tourelles). The central tower at the front has a projecting frontispiece three storeys high; above it is a statue of St George and the Dragon in a niche.

Interior
Much of the interior detail has now been lost, so the interior is mostly quite plain; some rooms have surviving boarded roofs. A wallplate in the main hall has carved foliage. The main hall's roof is in three sections; it was painted by J.G. Crace.

History

Nineteenth century

The Royal Victoria Patriotic Building is a Grade 2 Gothic Revival listed building on the edge of Wandsworth Common, South West London. It was built as the school of the Royal Victoria Patriotic Asylum on land enclosed from Wandsworth Common, one of 53 such enclosures made (lawfully) in the years between 1794 and 1866. The building was designed by Rohde Hawkins in the then popular Gothic style. The foundation stone was laid by Queen Victoria on 11 July 1857; the building was completed in only 18 months. The rapid construction was facilitated by offsite prefabrication of many components such as cast iron windows, stone dressings, roof trusses, iron floor joists and decorative pieces of leadwork.

The money for the building came from Prince Albert's Royal Patriotic Fund, which raised nearly £1.5 million by public subscription for the widows and orphans of soldiers killed in the Crimean War. However, only £35,000 was actually used in the building's construction by George Myers of Lambeth.

The orphans lived in hard conditions; they had to pump water up to the tanks in the building's towers, do all the washing, and be washed outside in cold water. When the installed warm air heating system failed, no fireplaces were built in the orphans' quarters. The orphans were reportedly abused by the rector, one orphan dying as a result, leading to a scandal.

Twentieth century
During the First World War, the building was requisitioned by the War Office to create the 3rd London General Hospital, a facility for the Royal Army Medical Corps to treat military casualties. It was refurbished with stronger roof trusses, repointed brickwork, new Westmoreland slates on the roof, and a new heating system. The field behind the hospital was packed with marquees holding about 1,800 soldiers wounded at the front; many thousands of soldiers were treated at the hospital during the war.

After the First World War, the building reverted to its earlier use as the Royal Victoria Patriotic School, still for girls, until the children were evacuated to Wales in 1939.

During the Second World War, MI5 interrogators including 'spycatcher' Colonel Oreste Pinto interviewed over 30,000 immigrants to the UK at the euphemistically named "London Reception Centre" in the building over a period of four years.

After the Second World War, the building initially housed a teachers' training college. In 1952 it was bought by London County Council; from 1955 it housed Honeywell Secondary Mixed School, followed by Spencer Park Comprehensive School for Boys until 1974. As the building aged, it became structurally unsafe and the school moved to a new building.

From 1974, the Royal Victoria Patriotic Building fell into disrepair, losing most of its windows, and thousands of feral pigeons moved in. Thieves stole lead from the roofs and water tanks, allowing rain into the building's fabric: dry rot then destroyed much of the timber structure including floors and door frames. The building came under threat of demolition, but was saved by campaigning by the Victorian Society and the Wandsworth Society, and became a Grade II listed building.

In 1980 the Greater London Council (GLC), successor to London County Council, granted a lease with the option to buy the building for £1 to a developer, Tuberg Property Company. Restoration took six years. Just before formal handover by the GLC, the main hall with its elaborate hammer beam ceiling was destroyed by arson. The hall was fully restored from a photographic survey which luckily had been made two weeks earlier.

The Civic Trust awarded a commendation in 1985 for the hall ceiling. In 1987 the Civic Trust awarded another commendation for the restoration of the building as a whole. Also in 1987, the restoration won the Europa Nostra Order of Merit.

Use

The building was refurbished in the 1980s, and now houses a variety of small businesses, 29 flats and the "Le Gothique" restaurant. The restaurant hosts the Wandsworth Common Beer Festival twice a year.

References

External links
 ALRA
 RVPB: History
 RVPB: Photo Library
 Wandsworth Common

Grade II* listed educational buildings
Scottish baronial architecture
Grade II* listed buildings in the London Borough of Wandsworth